The 2000 CCHA Men's Ice Hockey Tournament was the 29th CCHA Men's Ice Hockey Tournament. It was played between March 10 and March 18, 2000. First round and play-in games were played at campus sites, while all 'final four' games were played at Joe Louis Arena in Detroit, Michigan. By winning the tournament, Michigan State received the Central Collegiate Hockey Association's automatic bid to the 2000 NCAA Division I Men's Ice Hockey Tournament.

Format
The tournament featured three rounds of play. The two teams that finish below tenth place in the standings were not eligible for postseason play. In the quarterfinals, the first and tenth seeds, the second and ninth seeds, the third and eighth seeds, the fourth and seventh seeds and the fifth and sixth seeds played a best-of-three series, with the top three ranked winners advancing to the semifinals and two lower-seeded teams playing in a single play-in game to determine the final qualifier. In the semifinals, the remaining highest and lowest seeds and second highest and second lowest seeds play a single-game, with the winners advancing to the finals. The tournament champion receives an automatic bid to the 2000 NCAA Men's Division I Ice Hockey Tournament.

Conference standings
Note: GP = Games played; W = Wins; L = Losses; T = Ties; PTS = Points; GF = Goals For; GA = Goals Against

Bracket

Note: * denotes overtime period(s)

First round

(1) Michigan vs. (10) Western Michigan

(2) Michigan State vs. (9) Miami

(3) Lake Superior State vs. (8) Bowling Green

(4) Northern Michigan vs. (7) Nebraska-Omaha

(5) Notre Dame vs. (6) Ferris State

Play-In

(7) Nebraska-Omaha vs. (8) Bowling Green

Semifinals

(1) Michigan vs. (7) Nebraska-Omaha

(2) Michigan State vs. (5) Notre Dame

Championship

(2) Michigan State vs. (7) Nebraska-Omaha

Tournament awards

All-Tournament Team
F Rustyn Dolyny (Michigan State)
F Jeff Hoggan (Nebraska-Omaha)
F Shawn Horcoff (Michigan State)
D Andrew Hutchinson (Michigan State)
D Greg Zanon (Nebraska-Omaha)
G Ryan Miller* (Michigan State)
* Most Valuable Player(s)

References

External links
1999-00 CCHA Season

CCHA Men's Ice Hockey Tournament
Ccha tournament
CCHA Men's Ice Hockey